Adrien Gabriel Victurnien de Rougé (2 July 1782 in Everly – 16 June 1838 in Guyencourt), was a French statesman, distinguished soldier, and Peer of France member of the House of Rougé.

Adrien was a son of Bonabes, Marquis de Rougé and his wife Natalie Victurnienne. He served under the Comte d'Artois, later King Charles X, in the Army of the Princes, first as a second lieutenant in the Infantry, then in 1800 as a "" in the Mortemart regiment. He served then as an officer of the King's Mousquetaires in 1814.

In 1816, Charles X appointed him to the Peerage with the title of Comte. For a time he commanded one of the four subdivisions of the army stationed in Paris. He became the leader of the Knights of the Faith, a very powerful secret ultra conservative organisation. He refused his allegiance to the government of King Louis Philippe.

Family
By his wife, Caroline de Forbin d'Oppède (1789-1872), married on 18 September 1809, in Arnouville, they had four children:
Félix, Comte de Rougé 1810–1893
Armel, Comte de Rougé 1813–1898
Marie de Rougé 1816–1860
Delphine de Rougé 1820–1852.

References

Rouge, Adrien, Count de
Rouge, Adrien, Count de
Adrien, Count de
Peers of France